Rhodamnia cinerea is a rainforest tree of Southeast Asia, in the genus Rhodamnia.

It is a small tree that grows up to 15 m. In Sundanese, this tree is called "ki beusi". The name 'Silverback'  was given due to the silvery underside of the leaves for individuals growing in open country. The leaves (2–7 cm) are simple, opposite, oblong, with three main longitudinal veins.

The clustered flowers are small, white and fragrant, reddish at the centre.

The fruits are berries that turn from green to red then black when mature. Each has 3–8 seeds.

References

cinerea
Flora of Myanmar
Flora of Thailand
Flora of Malesia